Yrsa Daley-Ward (born 1989) is an English writer, model and actor. She is known for her debut book, Bone, as well as for her spoken-word poetry, and for being an "Instagram poet". Her memoir, The Terrible, was published in 2018, and in 2019 it won the PEN/Ackerley Prize. She co-wrote Black Is King, Beyoncé's musical film and visual album, which also serves as a visual companion to the 2019 album The Lion King: The Gift.

Life and career 
Yrsa Daley-Ward was born to a Jamaican mother and Nigerian father in Chorley, Lancashire, in Northern England, where she grew up with her grandparents, who were devout Seventh-day Adventists.

In her late teens and early 20s, Daley-Ward was a model, "working for brands such as Apple, Topshop, Estée Lauder and Nike". In search of better opportunities, she found the money to buy a ticket to South Africa, where she eventually lived for three years, and has said: "The thing that attracted me to South Africa was that the models look like me and there's so much more diversity".

In her mid-20s, she began to perform and get recognized for her poetry in Cape Town, South Africa, while also working as a model. Not long after returning to London in 2012, she was invited back to South Africa to work alongside the British Council headlining two poetry festivals in Johannesburg.

Daley-Ward was then listed as one of the top five female writers to watch for by Company Magazine.

Daley-Ward is known for her poems and writings on topics such as identity, race, mental health, and femininity. She is also known for being vocal on topics of depression, and for her poem entitled "Mental Health", which was published in her book Bone.  First self-published in 2014, and subsequently issued by Penguin Books in 2017 with additional poems and an introductory essay by Kiese Laymon, Bone has been described by Hanif Abdurraqib in The Atlantic as an "impressive debut" that "honestly excavates a writer’s life, not simply presenting pain, but also showing an individual working through it."

While she is now better known for her poetry, both written and spoken, before releasing Bone in 2014, she released a book of short stories entitled On Snakes and Other Stories in 2013. 
  
Daley-Ward has used social media platforms such as Instagram and Twitter in order to promote her work and connect with her fans. She also made an appearance in a TEDx Talk conference with her talk Your Stories and You.

In her writings, Daley-Ward has been known to openly discuss her relationships with women, and has even become a poster child for the LGBTQ+ community, but she refuses to make her sexuality a big deal. She says that her poems are meant for people of all sexual preferences.

Daley-Ward has been quoted as saying: "If you're afraid to write it, that's a good sign. I suppose you know you're writing the truth when you're terrified".  In an interview with ELLE, she talks openly about her past and struggles along her own journey in developing thicker skin in the face of criticism.

In June 2018, her new book The Terrible was published, a coming-of-age memoir that The Evening Standard called "a rare combination of literary brilliance, originality of voice and a narrative that commands you to keep going until you’ve reached the last page", while the reviewer for The Sunday Times described Daley-Ward as "a stylish writer, as well as an unusual voice". The same month, Daley-Ward discussed her life on BBC Radio Four's Woman's Hour and read her poem "Poetry". In 2019 The Terrible won the PEN/Ackerley Prize.

Daley-Ward co-wrote Black Is King, Beyoncé's musical film and visual album, which serves as a visual companion to the 2019 album The Lion King: The Gift. Daley-Ward's work has appeared in many publications worldwide, including Vogue, Elle, Harper's Bazaar, Dazed, Playboy and Notion. She is also a contributor to the 2019 anthology New Daughters of Africa, edited by Margaret Busby.

Daley-Ward's 2021 book, The How – Notes on the Great Work of Meeting Yourself, is "a compilation of essays, poems, heartfelt musings and earnest advice that provides a 'nudge toward' finding your voice".

Filmography

Publications

Books
On Snakes and Other Stories (3:am Press, 2013)
 Bone (CreateSpace Independent Publishing, 2014; Penguin (Particular Books), 2017, Foreword by Kiese Laymon)
The Terrible (Penguin, 2018)
The How – Notes on the Great Work of Meeting Yourself (Penguin, 2021, ISBN 9780143135609)

Acting work
 World on Fire (2019)
Boxx (2016)
White Colour Black (2016)
A Moving Image (2016)
Der Koch (2014)
Death Race: Inferno (2013) [video]
David is Dying (2011)

Also appeared in:

Kidnap and Ransom (2012)
Shameless (2009)
Drop Dead Gorgeous (2007)

See also
Kate Nash
Karley Sciortino
Nathan Stewart-Jarrett

References

External links
 Official website
 Taylor-Dior Rumble, "Yrsa Daley-Ward: The model who turned her pain into poetry", BBC News, 7 January 2018.
 Louise Carpenter, "Yrsa Daley-Ward: the extraordinary life of the model poet of Instagram", The Times, 2 June 2018.
 Una Mullally, "Yrsa Daley-Ward: ‘All the pretty women were all white’", Irish Times, 9 June 2018.

1989 births
21st-century British short story writers
21st-century English poets
21st-century English women writers
Black British actresses
Black British women writers
English people of Jamaican descent
English people of Nigerian descent
English women poets
Living people
People from Chorley